Toruń Główny railway station is the most important railway station serving the city of Toruń, in the Kuyavian-Pomeranian Voivodeship, Poland. The station is located on the Poznań–Skandawa railway and Kutno–Piła railway. The train services are operated by PKP, Przewozy Regionalne and Arriva.

Since 14 October 14, 2014, Toruń Główny has the highest category A (annual number of passengers over 2 million people).

History

The station was opened in 1861, but the current building was built in 1874. In the past, Toruń Główny was named Toruń Przedmieście.

Modernisation
Renovation of the railway station began in April 2014 and lasted until November 2015. The following aspects were modernised and rebuilt:

 The main station building - renovated the façade of removing old paint and the unveiling of the historic brick (to restore to the original condition), roofing, windows and interior of the building. The entire station building has gained representative character.
 Platforms - all four platforms of the station were modernized and rebuilt. The platforms are equipped with shelters for travelers and electronic information boards.
 Tunnel - existing underpass was rebuilt and extended, and also was added the missing part leading to the street behind the station. In the basement the station will accommodate small shops and services.
 The station square - the square outside the station created a "park & ride" and also the renovated bus station
 Post building - this was used from October 2014 as a temporary station. After completion of the entire project, the building will be transformed into a hotel with 60 seats and a conference hall.

This project was developed within the project "Integration of the urban transport system with the purchase of the tram in Torun - BiT - City". The project was almost 80% co-financed by the European Union. The investment cost of more than 43.5 million zł; the value of the grant 25.6 million zł.

Train services
The station is served by the following services:

Intercity services Gdynia - Gdansk - Bydgoszcz - Torun - Kutno - Lowicz - Warsaw - Lublin - Rzeszow - Zagorz/Przemysl
Intercity services Gdynia - Gdansk - Bydgoszcz - Torun - Kutno - Lodz - Czestochowa - Katowice - Bielsko-Biala
Intercity services Gdynia - Gdansk - Bydgoszcz - Torun - Kutno - Lodz - Czestochowa - Krakow - Zakopane
Intercity services Kolobrzeg - Pila - Bydgoszcz - Torun - Kutno - Lowicz - Warsaw
Intercity services Szczecin - Pila - Bydgoszcz - Torun - Kutno - Lowicz - Warsaw - Lublin - Rzeszow - Przemysl
Intercity services Gorzow Wielkopolskie - Krzyz - Pila - Bydgoszcz - Torun - Kutno - Lowicz - Warsaw
Intercity services Wroclaw / Zielona Gora - Poznan - Torun - Ilawa - Olsztyn - Elk - Bialystok
Regional services (R) Bydgoszcz - Solec Kujawski - Torun
Regional services (R) Bydgoszcz - Solec Kujawski - Torun - Wloclawek - Kutno
Regional services (R) Poznan - Gniezno - Mogilno - Inowroclaw - Torun
Regional services (R) Torun - Jablonowo Pomorskie - Ilawa - Olsztyn
Regional services (AR) Torun - Chelmza - Grudziadz
Regional services (AR) Torun - Sierpc

Bus services

Preserved locomotive
Steam engine TKh49-5564 is plinthed outside the north entrance to the station.

References

 Zygmunt Kruszelnicki, Z dziejów i ikonografii najstarszego dworca kolejowego w Toruniu [w:] Acta Universitatis Nicolai Copernici. Nauki Humanistyczno-Społeczne. Zabytkoznawstwo i Konserwatorstwo, z. 12 (164), 1987, s. 151-174  (lang=pl)
 This article is based upon a translation of the Polish language version as of May 2016.

External links
 

Railway stations in Poland opened in 1861
Buildings and structures in Toruń
Railway stations in Kuyavian-Pomeranian Voivodeship
Railway stations served by Przewozy Regionalne InterRegio
1861 establishments in Prussia